Joel Kalonji-Kalonji (born 4 January 1998) is a Belgian footballer who plays as a midfielder in Luxembourg for Union Titus Pétange.

Club career
Kalonji was a youth product of Charleroi, Anderlecht, and Standard Liège, before moving to Mouscron. Kalonji made his professional debut for Mouscron in a 0–0 Belgian First Division A tie with Genk on 11 November 2018.

References

External links
Soccerway Profile
RTL Profile
L'equipe Profile

1998 births
Living people
Belgian footballers
Belgian sportspeople of Democratic Republic of the Congo descent
Association football midfielders
Belgian Pro League players
Royal Excel Mouscron players
Luxembourg National Division players
Belgian expatriate footballers
Expatriate footballers in Luxembourg
R. Châtelet S.C. players